In Buddhism, an arhat (Sanskrit: अर्हत्) or arahant (Pali: अरहन्त्, 𑀅𑀭𑀳𑀦𑁆𑀢𑁆) is one who has gained insight into the true nature of existence and has achieved Nirvana and liberated from the  endless cycle of rebirth. Mahayana Buddhist traditions have used the term for people far advanced along the path of Enlightenment, but who may not have reached full Buddhahood.

The understanding of the concept has changed over the centuries, and varies between different schools of Buddhism and different regions. A range of views on the attainment of arhats existed in the early Buddhist schools. The Sarvāstivāda, Kāśyapīya, Mahāsāṃghika, Ekavyāvahārika, Lokottaravāda, Bahuśrutīya, Prajñaptivāda, and Caitika schools all regarded arhats as imperfect in their attainments compared to buddhas.

Mahayana Buddhist teachings urge followers to take up the path of a bodhisattva, and to not fall back to the level of arhats and śrāvakas. The arhats, or at least the senior arhats, came to be widely regarded by Theravada buddhists as "moving beyond the state of personal freedom to join the Bodhisattva enterprise in their own way".

Mahayana Buddhism regarded a group of Eighteen Arhats (with names and personalities) as awaiting the return of the Buddha as Maitreya, while other groupings of 6, 8, 16, 100, and 500 also appear in tradition and Buddhist art, especially in East Asia called luohan or lohan. They may be seen as the Buddhist equivalents of the Christian saint, apostles or early disciples and leaders of the faith.

Etymology

The Sanskrit word arhat (Pāḷi arahant) is a present participle coming from the verbal root √arh "to deserve", cf. arha "meriting, deserving"; arhaṇa "having a claim, being entitled"; arhita (past participle) "honoured, worshipped". The word is used in the Ṛgveda with this sense of "deserving".

Meaning

In early Buddhist schools
In pre-Buddhist India, the term arhat (denoting a saintly person in general) was closely associated with miraculous power and asceticism. Buddhists made a sharp distinction between their arhats and Indian holy men, and miraculous powers were no longer central to arhat identity or mission.

A range of views on the relative perfection of arhats existed in the early Buddhist schools. Mahāsāṃghikas, such as the Ekavyāvahārika, Lokottaravāda, Bahuśrutīya, Prajñaptivāda and Caitika schools, advocated the transcendental nature of the buddhas and bodhisattvas and the fallibility of arhats; the Caitikas advocated the ideal of the bodhisattva (bodhisattvayāna) over that of the arhat (śrāvakayāna), and viewed arhats as fallible and still subject to ignorance.

According to A. K. Warder, the Sarvāstivādins held the same position as the Mahāsāṃghika branch about arhats, considering them imperfect and fallible. In the Sarvāstivādin Nāgadatta Sūtra, the demon Māra takes the form of Nāgadatta's father and tries to convince Nāgadatta (who was a bhikṣuṇī) to work toward the lower stage of arhatship rather than strive to become a fully enlightened buddha (samyaksaṃbuddha):

In her reply, Nāgadatta rejects arhatship as a lower path: "A Buddha's wisdom is like empty space of the ten-quarters, which can enlighten innumerable people. But an Arhat's wisdom is inferior." The Kāśyapīya school also believed that arhats were fallible and imperfect, similar to the view of the Sarvāstivādins and the  Mahāsāṃghika sects. The Kāśyapīyins believed that arhats have not fully eliminated desire, their "perfection" is incomplete, and it is possible for them to relapse.

In Theravāda Buddhism
In Theravada Buddhism, an arahant is a person who has eliminated all the unwholesome roots which underlie the fetters – who upon their death will not be reborn in any world, since the bonds (fetters) that bind a person to the samsara have been finally dissolved. In the Pali Canon, the word tathagata is sometimes used as a synonym for arhat, though the former usually refers to the Buddha alone.

After attainment of nirvana, the five aggregates (physical forms, feelings/sensations, perception, mental formations and consciousness) will continue to function, sustained by physical bodily vitality. This attainment is termed the nirvana element with a residue remaining. But once the arhat passes away and with the disintegration of the physical body, the five aggregates will cease to function, hence ending all traces of existence in the phenomenal world and thus total release from the misery of samsara. It would then be termed the nirvana element without residue remaining. Parinirvana occurs at the death of an arhat.

In Theravada Buddhism, the Buddha himself is first identified as an arhat, as are his enlightened followers, because they are free from all defilements, existing without greed, hatred, delusion, ignorance and craving. Lacking "assets" which will lead to future birth, the arhat knows and sees the real here and now. This virtue shows stainless purity, true worth, and the accomplishment of the end, nirvana.

In the Pali canon, Ānanda states that he knows monastics to achieve nirvana in one of four ways:

 one develops insight preceded by serenity,
 one develops serenity preceded by insight,
 one develops serenity and insight in a stepwise fashion,
 one's mind becomes seized by excitation about the dhamma and, as a consequence, develops serenity and abandons the fetters.

For those that have destroyed greed and hatred (in the sensory context) with some residue of delusion, are called anagami (non-returner). Anagamis will not be reborn into the human world after death, but into the heaven of the Pure Abodes, where only anagamis live. There, they will attain full enlightenment.

The Theravadin commentator Buddhaghosa placed the arhat at the completion of the path to liberation.

In Mahāyāna Buddhism

Mahayana Buddhists see Gautama Buddha himself as the ideal towards which one should aim in one's spiritual aspirations. A hierarchy of general attainments is envisioned with the attainments of arhats and pratyekabuddhas being clearly separate from and below those of samyaksambuddha or tathāgatas such as Gautama Buddha.

In contrast to the goal of becoming a fully enlightened buddha, the path of a śrāvaka in being motivated by seeking personal liberation from saṃsāra is often portrayed as selfish and undesirable. There are even some Mahāyāna texts that regard the aspiration to arhatship and personal liberation as an outside path. Instead of aspiring for arhatship, Mahayanins are urged to instead take up the path of the bodhisattva and to not fall back to the level of arhats and śrāvakas. Therefore, it is taught that an arhat must go on to become a bodhisattva eventually. If they fail to do so in the lifetime in which they reach the attainment, they will fall into a deep samādhi of emptiness, thence to be roused and taught the bodhisattva path, presumably when ready. According to the Lotus Sutra, any true arhat will eventually accept the Mahāyāna path.

Mahāyāna teachings often consider the śrāvaka path to be motivated by fear of saṃsāra, which renders them incapable of aspiring to buddhahood, and that they therefore lack the courage and wisdom of a bodhisattva. Novice bodhisattvas are compared to śrāvakas and arhats at times. This is because they are still viewed as having innate attachment and fear of saṃsāra. The  compares these people to a giant bird without wings that cannot help but plummet to the earth from the top of Sumeru.

Mahayan Buddhism has viewed the śrāvaka path culminating in arhatship as a lesser accomplishment than complete enlightenment, but still accords due respect to arhats for their respective achievements. Therefore, buddha-realms are depicted as populated by both śrāvakas and bodhisattvas. Far from being completely disregarded, the accomplishments of arhats are viewed as impressive, essentially because they have transcended the mundane world. Chinese Buddhism and other East Asian traditions have historically accepted this perspective, and specific groups of arhats are venerated as well, such as the Sixteen Arhats, the Eighteen Arhats, and the Five Hundred Arhats. The first famous portraits of these arhats were painted by the Chinese monk Guanxiu in 891 CE. He donated these portraits to Shengyin Temple in Qiantang (modern Hangzhou), where they are preserved with great care and ceremonious respect.

In some respects, the path to arhatship and the path to complete enlightenment are seen as having common grounds. However, a distinctive difference is seen in the Mahāyāna doctrine pushing emotional and cognitive non-attachment to their logical consequences. Of this, Paul Williams writes that in Mahāyāna Buddhism, "Nirvāṇa must be sought without being sought (for oneself), and practice must be done without being practiced. The discursive mode of thinking cannot serve the basic purpose of attainment without attainment."

Attainments
A range of views on the attainment of arhats existed in the early Buddhist schools. The Sarvāstivāda, Kāśyapīya, Mahāsāṃghika, Ekavyāvahārika, Lokottaravāda, Bahuśrutīya, Prajñaptivāda and Caitika schools all regarded arhats as being imperfect in their attainments compared to buddhas.

The Dharmaguptaka sect believed that "the Buddha and those of the Two Vehicles, although they have one and the same liberation, have followed different noble paths."

The Mahīśāsaka and the Theravada regarded arhats and buddhas as being similar to one another. The 5th century Theravadin commentator Buddhaghosa regarded arhats as having completed the path to enlightenment. According to Bhikkhu Bodhi, the Pāli Canon portrays the Buddha declaring himself to be an arahant. According to Bhikkhu Bodhi, nirvāṇa is "the ultimate goal", and one who has attained nirvana has attained arhatship: Bhikkhu Bodhi writes, "The defining mark of an arahant is the attainment of nirvāṇa in this present life."

The Mahayana discerned a hierarchy of attainments, with samyaksambuddhas at the top, mahāsattvas below that, pratyekabuddhas below that and arhats further below. "But what was it that distinguished the bodhisattva from the sravaka, and ultimately the buddha from the arhat? The difference lay, more than anywhere else, in the altruistic orientation of the bodhisattva."

Translations

The term arhat is often rendered in English as arahat. The term arhat was transliterated into some East Asian languages phonetically, for example, the Chinese āluóhàn (Ch. 阿羅漢), often shortened to simply luóhàn (Ch. 羅漢). This may appear in English as luohan or lohan. In Japanese the pronunciation of the same Chinese characters is rakan (Ja. 羅漢) or arakan (Ja. 阿羅漢).

The Tibetan term for arhat was translated by meaning from Sanskrit. This translation, dgra bcom pa, means "one who has destroyed the foes of afflictions". Thus the Tibetan translators also understood the meaning of arhat to be ari-hanta.

See also
 Arihant (Jainism)
 Buddhist paths to liberation
 Four stages of enlightenment
 Pratyekabuddha
Yashahime: Princess Half-Demon
 Yixian glazed pottery luohans
 Killing an arhat is a anantarika-karma crime.

Explanatory notes

Citations

General sources

Further reading
 Addiss, Stephen. The Art of Zen: Paintings and Calligraphy by Japanese Monks, 1600–1925. New York: H.N. Abrams. 1989.
 Bodhi, Bhikkhu (ed.) (2005). In the Buddha's Words: An Anthology of Discourses from the Pāli Canon. Boston: Wisdom Pubs. .
 Bush, Susan, and Hsio-yen Shih. Early Chinese Texts on Painting. Cambridge, Massachusetts: Published for the Harvard-Yenching Institute by Harvard University Press. 1985.
 Joo, Bong Seok, "The Arhat Cult in China from the Seventh through Thirteenth Centuries:Narrative, Art, Space and Ritual" (PhD diss., Princeton University, 2007).
 Kai-man. 1986. The Illustrated 500 Lo Han. Hong Kong: Precious Art Publications.
 Katz, Nathan. Buddhist Images of Human Perfection: The Arahant of the Sutta Piṭaka Compared with the Bodhisattva and the Mahāsiddha. Delhi: Motilal Banarsidass. 1982.
 Kent, Richard K. "Depictions of the Guardians of the Law: Lohan Painting in China". In Latter Days of the Law: Images of Chinese Buddhism, Marsha Weidner, 183–213. N.p.:University of Hawaii Press, 1994.
 Khantipalo, Bhikkhu (1979). Banner of the ArahantKandy, Sri Lanka: Buddhist Publication Society. .
 Khantipalo, Bhikkhu (1989). Buddha, My Refuge: Contemplation of the Buddha based on the Pali Suttas. Kandy, Sri Lanka: Buddhist Publication Society. .  An excerpt from the "Introduction" is available on-line at https://groups.yahoo.com/group/Buddhawaslike/message/17.
 Laufer, Berthold. "Inspirational Dreams in Eastern Asia". The Journal of American Folklore 44, no. 172 (1931): 208–216.
 Levine, Gregory P. A., and Yukio Lippit. Awakenings: Zen Figure Painting in Medieval Japan. New York: Japan Society. 2007.
 Little, Stephen. "The Arhats in China and Tibet". Artibus Asiae 52 (1992): 255–281.
 Rhys Davids, T.W. & William Stede (eds.) (1921–5). The Pali Text Society's Pali–English dictionary. Chipstead: Pali Text Society.  A general on-line search engine for the PED is available at http://dsal.uchicago.edu/dictionaries/pali/.
 Seckel, Dietrich. "The Rise of Portraiture in Chinese Art". Artibus Asiae 53, no. 1/2 (1993): 7–26.
 Tanaka, Ichimatsu. Japanese Ink Painting: Shubun to Sesshu. New York: Weatherhill. 1972.
 Tredwell, Winifred Reed. Chinese Art Motives Interpreted. New York [etc.]: G.P. Putnam's Sons. 1915.
 Visser, Marinus Willem de. The Arhats in China and Japan. Berlin: Oesterheld & Co. 1923.
 Watanabe, Masako. "Guanxiu and Exotic Imagery in Raken Paintings". Orientations 31, no. 4 (2000): 34–42.
 Watters, Thomas. The Eighteen Lohan of Chinese Buddhist Temples. Shanghai: Kelly and Walsh. 1925.

External links

 Arahants, Bodhisattvas, and Buddhas, an article by Ven. Bhikkhu Bodhi
 Thanissaro Bhikkhu (trans.) (1998). Yuganaddha Sutta: In Tandem.

 
Buddhist stages of enlightenment
Buddhist titles
Epithets of Gautama Buddha